Māpua is a small town in the South Island of New Zealand. It is to the west of Nelson on State Highway 60 and on the coastline of Tasman Bay.

With a thriving wharf and commercial area, Māpua has grown in popularity for visitors, with numbers swelling the region over the summer months. A large fair and market is held every Easter Sunday. Up to 30,000 people visit the town on this day to enjoy rides, stalls, and other attractions. The local schools and playcentre benefit from the fair, which is their primary fundraising activity.

History

Before 1930 

Middens, tools and human bones found at Grossis Point and around the northern edges of the Waimea inlet suggest small seasonal Māori settlements were located here, with a major pā (fortified settlement) located on the Kina Cliffs to the north. The pā remained in use in the period of early European settlement of the Māpua district; the public can visit the site. The lack of evidence of cannibalism and the rarity of weapons suggest that the Māori living in this district were peaceful and seldom were involved in wars. In the late 1820s, Māori from the North Island (led by the Māori Chief Te Rauparaha) came to the South Island with warriors armed with muskets. Te Rauparaha took over Marlborough before sending half his army west to take over Tasman Bay / Te Tai-o-Aorere and Golden Bay. Owing to the invaders' considerable advantage in weaponry and skill, they soon overcame the local Māori populations. After a battle, most of the invaders moved on, leaving only a small local population of Māori in the region.

The first land-sale to a European in Māpua involved 166 acres, bought in 1854 by Captain James S. Cross for 60 pounds.

The first European resident of Māpua, James Heatly, worked as a fisherman and hunted rabbits, which he brought to Nelson to sell. The port area was originally known as the Western Entrance, and the township dubbed Seaton Township (by a surveyor who had been subdividing part of the town). Mr F.I. Ledger helped plan out the town and later named it "Mapua" which was also what the New Zealand telephone guide named it. Māpua means "abundance" or "prolific" when interpreted into English. By 1915, a substantial wharf could cope with larger ships coming into the harbour for the apple trade, which was booming at this time. The poor roads in the area meant that shipping the apples out was the only option, however eventually a road was built around the Ruby Bay bluffs, linking Nelson with Motueka. A shop, first opened in 1921 to service the locals, stood on the same plot of land as the  shop.

The name of the town was officially gazetted as Māpua on 5 November 2018.

Former contaminated site
In the 20th century Māpua became one of the most contaminated sites in New Zealand due to pesticide residues in the soils from a now defunct factory, but the 21st century saw a major cleanup operation.

In 1932 the Fruitgrowers Chemical Company built a plant to manufacture pesticides for use in the numerous orchards in the surrounding area. In the 1940s the factory produced organomercury and organochlorine pesticides, including DDT, DDD, dieldrin, 2,4-D and paraquat. Organophosphorous pesticides were produced from the 1960s. By 1978, 124 chemicals were being used to produce 84 different formulations. The plant closed in 1988.

The Tasman District Council took over the site in 1989, and measures were taken to prevent leaching of the chemicals into the adjoining Waimea Inlet. In 1999, the Ministry for the Environment allocated funding for a remediation programme, with "on-site" processing selected as the preferred remediation option. Two years later, the Tasman District Council awarded a contract for remedial work to a partnership of Theiss Services (an Australian remediation specialist) and Environmental Decontamination Limited (EDL) of Auckland. Thiess, the main contractor, held the resource consents to carry out the work; EDL supplied the remediation technology: Mechano-Chemical Dehalogenation (MCD). The site was handed back to the Tasman District Council in November 2007.

In May 2012, a Department of Labour report  found that some of the 30 people who worked on the cleanup suffered health issues including respiratory problems, nausea, collapsing and fatigue.

Demographics

Māpua

It had a population of 1,254 at the 2018 New Zealand census, an increase of 144 people (13.0%) since the 2013 census, and an increase of 180 people (16.8%) since the 2006 census. There were 489 households. There were 624 males and 615 females, giving a sex ratio of 1.01 males per female, with 231 people (18.4%) aged under 15 years, 96 (7.7%) aged 15 to 29, 564 (45.0%) aged 30 to 64, and 348 (27.8%) aged 65 or older.

Ethnicities were 95.9% European/Pākehā, 4.8% Māori, 0.0% Pacific peoples, 1.2% Asian, and 1.4% other ethnicities (totals add to more than 100% since people could identify with multiple ethnicities).

Although some people objected to giving their religion, 61.5% had no religion, 29.2% were Christian, 0.2% were Hindu and 1.9% had other religions.

Of those at least 15 years old, 291 (28.4%) people had a bachelor or higher degree, and 126 (12.3%) people had no formal qualifications. The employment status of those at least 15 was that 414 (40.5%) people were employed full-time, 192 (18.8%) were part-time, and 18 (1.8%) were unemployed.

Ruby Bay-Māpua statistical area

Ruby Bay-Māpua had a population of 2,562 at the 2018 New Zealand census, an increase of 441 people (20.8%) since the 2013 census, and an increase of 615 people (31.6%) since the 2006 census. There were 972 households. There were 1,260 males and 1,302 females, giving a sex ratio of 0.97 males per female. The median age was 50.5 years (compared with 37.4 years nationally), with 471 people (18.4%) aged under 15 years, 228 (8.9%) aged 15 to 29, 1,212 (47.3%) aged 30 to 64, and 651 (25.4%) aged 65 or older.

Ethnicities were 95.6% European/Pākehā, 6.0% Māori, 1.1% Pacific peoples, 1.3% Asian, and 1.9% other ethnicities (totals add to more than 100% since people could identify with multiple ethnicities).

The proportion of people born overseas was 27.8%, compared with 27.1% nationally.

Although some people objected to giving their religion, 61.5% had no religion, 28.8% were Christian, 0.1% were Hindu, 0.1% were Muslim, 0.7% were Buddhist and 1.4% had other religions.

Of those at least 15 years old, 627 (30.0%) people had a bachelor or higher degree, and 276 (13.2%) people had no formal qualifications. The median income was $32,300, compared with $31,800 nationally. The employment status of those at least 15 was that 873 (41.8%) people were employed full-time, 384 (18.4%) were part-time, and 39 (1.9%) were unemployed.

Mountain biking 
Mapua is one of the stops on the Tasman's Great Taste Trail which is a mountain bike trail which links the towns of Nelson, Wakefield, Richmond, Motueka and Kaiteriteri.

Education

References

External links 
 Mapua portal
 Mapua Community Library
 Mapua Wharf

Populated places in the Tasman District
Populated places around Tasman Bay / Te Tai-o-Aorere